HMS Diamond is the third ship of the Type 45 or Daring-class air-defence destroyers built for the Royal Navy. She was launched in 2007, completed her contractor's sea trials in July 2010 and arrived at her base port on 22 September 2010. Diamond was commissioned in a traditional ceremony on 6 May 2011, and formally entered service on 12 July 2011.

Construction
Diamonds construction began at the BAE Systems Naval Ships yard at Govan on the River Clyde in February 2005. She was launched on 27 November 2007.

Sea trials
By July 2010, Diamond had been fully fitted out and finished her contractors' sea trials (stage 1 trials). She arrived in her base port of HMNB Portsmouth on 22 September 2010.

Operational service

Diamond was commissioned in a traditional ceremony on 6 May 2011 in her home port of Portsmouth. The ceremony was attended by the ship's sponsor and the Commander-in-Chief Fleet Admiral Sir Trevor Soar. Diamond continued undergoing sea trials until she entered operational service in July 2011 after the completion of her trials. The ship conducted operational training before commencing her first overseas deployment. Diamond commenced her deployment in the summer of 2012, starting with celebrations to mark the Diamond Jubilee of Her Majesty Queen Elizabeth II.

Diamond was in the Middle East Area of Operations in 2012. During Operation Recsyr in February 2014 she escorted  carrying chemical agents from Syria.

On 8 May 2017, Diamond performed a demonstration firing of an Aster 30 off the coast of Scotland.

On 4 September 2017, Diamond sailed for a 9-month deployment to the Middle East, initially scheduled to relieve HMS Monmouth, she was instead diverted to take over as flagship of Standing NATO Maritime Group 2 from sister HMS Duncan when her intended relief, HMS Ocean was redeployed to provide relief to British Overseas Territories in the Caribbean in the wake of Hurricane Irma. Diamond was relieved of her NATO duties upon the return of Ocean from the Caribbean on 30 October and resumed her planned deployment to relieve Monmouth. However, on 23 November, The Times reported that Diamond was being forced to abandon her deployment and return to Portsmouth early due to mechanical issues, which was later confirmed by the Ministry of Defence.

On 10 April 2021, Diamond left Portsmouth to conduct a 41-gun salute after the passing of His Royal Highness Prince Philip, the Duke of Edinburgh. The ship flew her ensign at half-mast.

However, she was compelled to detach from the group for repair in July due to reported "technical issues" likely linked to longstanding power and propulsion reliability issues with ships of the class. It was later reported that the ship had "suffered a failure of one of her gas turbines". Repairs were undertaken in Taranto, Italy and at the end of August Diamond returned to sea to rejoin the group. In mid-October 2021, after rejoining the strike group, the destroyer again experienced "technical issues" (this time reportedly not related to her propulsion system) and was compelled to put into Singapore to have them addressed.

Characteristics

Affiliations

Ship's sponsor
Lady Johns, wife of Vice Admiral Sir Adrian Johns KCB, CBE RN

Official affiliations
 Aberdeen City
 City of Coventry
 The Worshipful Company of Barbers
 The Worshipful Company of Makers of Playing Cards
 No. 3 Squadron RAF
 De Beers (UK)
 Loughborough Grammar School Naval Section CCF (Combined Cadet Force)

Other
As part of her affiliation with Coventry, Diamond carries a cross of nails created from the remains of Coventry Cathedral. At the end of the Second World War a cross of nails was created out of the wreckage and has been presented to all ships that carry the name Coventry.

The City of Sheffield was offered affiliation to Diamond, but this was turned down by Sheffield City Council and the Lord Mayor, who want the city associated with another . The affiliation has now been transferred to the City of Coventry.

Notes

References

External links 

 

 

Type 45 destroyers
Ships built on the River Clyde
2007 ships
Destroyers of the United Kingdom